The Fallon Range Training Complex (FRTC) is a United States Navy military area with four separate training ranges [plus] an integrated air defense system consisting of thirty-seven real or simulated radars throughout the Dixie Valley area of Nevada.  The entire FRTC is also instrumented with a Tactical Aircrew Combat Training System (TACTS).

Naval Air Station Fallon is the nearby military base supporting the FRTC, and the FRTC comes under the cognizance of the Naval Strike and Air Warfare Center (NSAWC) at Fallon for conducting Carrier Air Wing Training, Advanced Instructor Training, Fleet Replacement Squadron Detachment Training, integrated air-to-air and air-to-ground unit level training, joint exercises, and tactics development.

Geography

The FRTC is the land area of six (6) target and instrumented areas of  used by aircraft operating in airspace which overlays : a Supersonic Operating Area, the Austin MOA/AATCAA (Military Operating Area/Air Traffic Control Assigned Airspace), Gabbs MOA/ATCAA, Ranch MOA, Carson MOA, and Bengus ATCAA.

Bravo 16

Bravo 17

Bravo 19

Bravo 20
Target Bravo 20 (B-20), located in Restricted Area 4802 (R-4802) and Restricted Area 4813 (R-4813), is ~ north-northeast of NAS Fallon "at Lone Rock … in the Carson Sink". The 2 ranges total , and B-20 is the only Navy range authorized for use with 2,000 pound laser guided weapons.

Fallon Electronic Warfare Range

History

The Fallon range's "Target Baker (16-21)" was documented in 1957 and in 1958, the "Navy [was] relinquishing the air space and target" for Target B-20 "in favor of CAA requirements for airways".

Planning to integrate the range with the Nellis and Hill/Wendover/Dugway ranges to create the Great Basin's "Continental Operations Range" ended in 1975.

The 1986 Military Lands Withdrawal Act (Public Laws 99-606) reserved lands for use by the Secretary of the Navy for "testing and training for aerial bombing, missile firing, tactical maneuvering, and air support.  Public "hearings on the B-20 renewal were held in July of 1998"; and its "Final Environmental Impact Statement was endorsed by the Nevada State Director of the Bureau of Land Management in March 1999."  The Joint Tactical Combat Training System (JTCTS) was installed at FRTC in 2001.

References

Bombing ranges
Training installations of the United States Navy
Military installations in Nevada
Military installations established in the 1940s
1940s establishments in Nevada